Carlos Paro (born June 5, 1979, in Colina, Brazil) is an event rider who won a team bronze medal in the 2007 Pan American Games in Rio de Janeiro, Brazil in 2007, a team silver medal in the 2015 Pan American Games in Toronto, Canada and an Individual Bronze and team Silver in the 2019 Pan American Games in Lima, Peru in eventing (equestrian) for Brazil. He competed in the 2000 Summer Olympics in Sydney, Australia, in the 2016 Summer Olympics in Rio de Janeiro, Brazil. and in the 2020 Summer Olympics in Tokyo, Japan.

His 1st major event was the World Equestrian Games in Rome in 1998 at the age of 19 when they finished the team competition in 9th. He also won the team gold medal in the South American Games in Belo Horizonte in 2001.
Now based in the U.K., he is the only Brazilian to complete at Badminton Horse Trials and Burghley Horse Trials several times.

He was named as a reserve for the 2012 Summer Olympics in London, and a few days before the Games started, he was called into the team as one of the horses was injured, but due to a misunderstanding in the Brazilian Equestrian Federation (CBH – Confederacao Brasileira de Hipismo) his forms were never sent to the IOC (International Olympic Committee) which meant he wasn't allowed to compete.

In July 2015, Carlos Parro rode as one of the team members for the 2015 Pan American Games in Toronto, riding Calcourt Landline. The team won the silver medal just a few marks behind the USA.

Parro competed at his second Summer Olympics in 2016. At the Games held in front of his home crowd in Rio de Janeiro, Brazil, he finished 7th in the team competition and 18th individually with the horse Summon Up The Blood.

In 2019 with a new horse, Quaikin Qurious, Carlos Parro won the individual bronze medal at the 2019 Pan American Games in Lima, Peru and the team Silver medal, which qualified the Brazilian Eventing Team for the 2020 Olympics in Tokyo, Japan.

In October 2022, Carlos won an individual and team gold medal at the South American Championship in Buenos Aires, Argentina riding Tullabeg Chinzano.

Notable International Results

References

Living people
Brazilian male equestrians
Equestrians at the 2007 Pan American Games
Equestrians at the 2015 Pan American Games
Equestrians at the 2019 Pan American Games
Olympic equestrians of Brazil
1979 births
Equestrians at the 2000 Summer Olympics
Equestrians at the 2016 Summer Olympics
Pan American Games silver medalists for Brazil
Pan American Games bronze medalists for Brazil
Pan American Games medalists in equestrian
Medalists at the 2007 Pan American Games
Medalists at the 2015 Pan American Games
Medalists at the 2019 Pan American Games
Equestrians at the 2020 Summer Olympics
South American Games gold medalists for Brazil
South American Games medalists in equestrian
Competitors at the 2022 South American Games
People from Colina, São Paulo